Grumman Gulfstream were a family of aircraft produced by Grumman. The line is continued by Gulfstream Aerospace, now a division of General Dynamics.

 Grumman Gulfstream I
 Grumman Gulfstream II
 Gulfstream III
 Gulfstream G400/G450
 Gulfstream G500/G550